The discography of American rapper Takeoff consists of one studio album, one collaborative album, five singles and two other charted songs.

In 2017, Takeoff released the single "Intruder" as a non-album single and was featured on his uncle Quavo's collaborative project, Huncho Jack, Jack Huncho, with fellow rapper Travis Scott, on the song "Eye 2 Eye". The song charted on the Hot 100 at 65th and in Canada at 55th. In that year, he also collaborated with Scottish DJ Calvin Harris for his Funk Wav Bounces Vol. 1 album on the song titled "Holiday". The song, featuring Snoop Dogg and John Legend, charted on the Dance/Electronic Songs chart at 26th.

In 2018, he released his debut studio album The Last Rocket via Quality Control Music, Capitol Records and Motown, on November 2, 2018. The album peaked in the top 30 of the Netherlands and Norway charts at 29th and 24th respectively while placing at 42nd and 51st on the United Kingdom and Sweden charts. It also appeared on the Belgium and Ireland charts at 69th and 62nd. The album spawned the single "Last Memory", which appeared on the US and Canadian charts, while a non-single song from the album "Casper" appeared on the New Zealand Hot chart.

Studio albums

Collaborative albums

Extended plays

Singles

As lead artist

As featured artist

Other charted songs

See also
 Migos discography
 Quavo discography
 Offset discography

Notes

References 

Hip hop discographies
Discographies of American artists